Last Breath is a 2019 documentary film directed by Richard da Costa and Alex Parkinson. It relates the story of a serious saturation diving accident in 2012, when diver Chris Lemons had his umbilical cable severed and became trapped around  under the sea without heat or light, and with only the small amount of breathing gas in his backup tank.

Plot summary 
The documentary uses genuine footage and audio recorded at the time of the accident on the divers' radios and body cameras, supplemented with interviews of several of the individuals involved, as well as some reconstructed footage, to tell the story of the accident.

The vessel's dynamic positioning system, supplied by Kongsberg Maritime, failed. This caused the vessel to drift in rough seas, dragging the divers away from the area they were working and eventually snapping the umbilical tether that provided Lemons with heliox to breathe, as well as hot water to heat his suit, power for his light, and a communications link to the surface. He was left with only five minutes of breathable gas contained in the cylinders he wore on his back.

For reasons that are unclear to Lemons and his colleagues, but attributed in part to the cold water and having been breathing a gas mix with a high partial pressure of oxygen, Lemons survived for around 30 minutes while he was located by a remote underwater vehicle and then by Yuasa, who was able to pull him back onboard the diving bell.

Reception 
Reviews of the documentary were mixed. Empire Magazine gave it 3 stars, describing it as 'a great story' but comparing it unfavourably to similar survival documentaries such as Touching the Void. The Financial Times awarded 4 stars, and called it a 'powerful documentary'.

Distribution 
Last Breath was distributed in the UK by Dogwoof and was released simultaneously in cinemas and on Netflix on 5 April 2019.

In France the documentary was distributed by Arte on 11 September 2019 with the title Le survivant des abysses.

References 

British documentary films
Films scored by Paul Leonard-Morgan
2010s British films
Documentary films about underwater diving